The United Anti-Capitalist Left (EN.ANTI.A.) was a coalition of far-left political parties in Greece.

The United Anti-Capitalist Left was founded in 2007 by Socialist Workers' Party, the Organization of Communist Internationalists of Greece-Spartacus, Left Recomposition (Aristeri Anasynthesi) and Left Anti-capitalist Group (Aristeri Antikapitalistiki Syspirosi).

On 22 March 2009 United Anti-Capitalist Left and Radical Left Front founded Anticapitalist Left Cooperation for the Overthrow (ANTARSYA).

See also
Politics of Greece
List of political parties in Greece

External links
 ARAN
 ARAS
 OKDE Spartakos
 SEK

Anti-capitalist organizations
Defunct political party alliances in Greece
Political parties established in 2007